The discography of the Swedish DJ duo Axwell & Ingrosso, consists of one studio album, two extended plays, thirteen singles and one remix.

Studio albums

Extended plays

Singles

Promotional singles

Remixes

Notes

References

Electronic music group discographies
Discographies of Swedish artists